Lodrick Stewart (born April 30, 1985) is a former American college basketball player. He played at the  University of Southern California. Lodrick and twin brother Rodrick, attended Joyner Elementary School in Tupelo, Mississippi, before moving to Seattle, Washington.

Personal life
Stewart has a twin brother named Rodrick Stewart, and they have younger twin brothers, Hikeem and Kadeem Stewart, who played for University of Washington and Shoreline Community College, and their youngest brother Scotty Ewing played for South Puget Sound Community College and is now playing professionally in China.

High school career
Stewart attended basketball powerhouse Rainier Beach High School in Seattle.
He played alongside his brother Rodrick, Nate Robinson, Terrence Williams, and C. J. Giles. As a senior, he led his basketball team to a 28–1 record and won the AAA state championship.

College career
Stewart played for the USC Trojans between 2003 and 2007.  He was honorable mention Pac-10 his senior year and is the all-time 3 point leader for the Trojans. Stewart graduated from USC in 2007.

Pro career
Stewart played for the NBA Development League Anaheim Arsenal in 2007-2008.

In 2008-2009, Stewart played for the Giants Nördlingen in Germany. Later he went to Lithuania, Marijampolės "Sūduva".

On March 8, 2010, it was reported that Stewart and another American player, Rashaun Broadus, left the team without saying a word after a game on February 23, 2010 against Perlas.

References

External links
 NBA D-league bio
 Rashaun Broadus and Lodrick Stewart leave Suduva

1985 births
Living people
American expatriate basketball people in Germany
American expatriate basketball people in Lithuania
American men's basketball players
Anaheim Arsenal players
Basketball players from Seattle
Identical twins
Shooting guards
Shoreline Dolphins men's basketball players
American twins
Twin sportspeople
USC Trojans men's basketball players